In computability theory, computational complexity theory and proof theory, the Hardy hierarchy, named after G. H. Hardy, is a hierarchy of sets of numerical functions generated from an ordinal-indexed family of functions hα: N → N (where N is the set of natural numbers, {0, 1, ...}) called Hardy functions. It is related to the fast-growing hierarchy and slow-growing hierarchy.

Hardy hierarchy is introduced by Stanley S. Wainer in 1972, but the idea of its definition comes from Hardy's 1904 paper, in which Hardy exhibits a set of reals with cardinality .

Definition 
Let μ be a large countable ordinal such that a fundamental sequence is assigned to every limit ordinal less than μ. The Hardy functions hα: N → N, for α < μ, is then defined as follows:

 if α is a limit ordinal.

Here α[n] denotes the nth element of the fundamental sequence assigned to the limit ordinal α.  A standardized choice of fundamental sequence for all α ≤ ε0 is described in the article on the fast-growing hierarchy.

The Hardy hierarchy  is a family of numerical functions. For each ordinal , a set  is defined as the smallest class of functions containing , zero, successor and projection functions, and closed under limited primitive recursion and limited substitution (similar to Grzegorczyk hierarchy).

 defines a modified Hardy hierarchy of functions  by using the standard fundamental sequences, but with α[n+1] (instead of α[n]) in the third line of the above definition.

Relation to fast-growing hierarchy 
The Wainer hierarchy of functions fα and the Hardy hierarchy of functions hα are related by fα = hωα for all α < ε0.  Thus, for any α < ε0, hα grows much more slowly than does fα.   However, the Hardy hierarchy "catches up" to the Wainer hierarchy at α = ε0, such that fε0 and hε0 have the same growth rate, in the sense that fε0(n-1) ≤ hε0(n) ≤ fε0(n+1) for all n ≥ 1.

Notes

References 

. (In particular Section 12, pp. 59–64, "A Glimpse at Hierarchies of Fast and Slow Growing Functions".)
 .

Computability theory
Proof theory
Hierarchy of functions